In computer science, pseudopolynomial time number partitioning is a pseudopolynomial time algorithm for solving the partition problem.

The problem can be solved using dynamic programming when the size of the set and the size of the sum of the integers in the set are not too big to render the storage requirements infeasible.

Suppose the input to the algorithm is a multiset  of cardinality :

 S = {x1, ..., xN}

Let K be the sum of all elements in S. That is: K = x1 + ... + xN. If there is a subset, then:

 if K is even, the rest of S also sums to 
This is as good a solution as possible.

e.g.1 S = {1, 2, 3, 5}, K = sum(S) = 11, K/2 = 5, Find a subset from S that is closest to K/2 -> {2, 3} = 5, 11 - 5 * 2 = 1

e.g.2 S = {1, 3, 7}, K = sum(S) = 11, K/2 = 5, Find a subset from S that is closest to K/2 -> {1, 3} = 4, 11 - 4 * 2 = 3

Recurrence relation 
Let:

 p(i, j) be True if a subset of { x1, ..., xj } sums to i and False otherwise.

The goal of our algorithm will be to compute p(N). In aid of this, we have the following recurrence relation:

 p(i, j) is True if either p(i, j − 1) is True or if p(i − xj, j − 1) is True
 p(i, j) is False otherwise

The reasoning for this is as follows: there is some subset of S that sums to i using numbers

 x1, ..., xj

if and only if either of the following is true:

 There is a subset of { x1, ..., xj−1 } that sums to i;
 there is a subset of { x1, ..., xj−1 } that sums to i − xj, since xj + that subset's sum  = i.

The pseudo-polynomial algorithm 
The algorithm consists of building up a table of size  by  containing the values of the recurrence. Once the entire table is filled in, we return . Below is a depiction of the table . There is a blue arrow from one block to another if the value of the target-block might depend on the value of the source-block. This dependence is a property of the recurrence relation.

 function can_be_partitioned_equally(S) is
     input: A list of integers S.
     output: True if S can be partitioned into two subsets that have equal sum.
 
     n ← |S|
     K ← sum(S)
     P ← empty boolean table of size ( + 1) by (n + 1)
 
     initialize top row (P(0,x)) of P to True
     initialize leftmost column (P(x, 0)) of P, except for P(0, 0) to False
 
     for i from 1 to 
         for j from 1 to n
             x = S[j-1]
             if (i-x) >= 0 then
                 P(i, j) ← P(i, j-1) or P(i-x, j-1)
             else
                 P(i, j) ← P(i, j-1)
 
    return P(n)

Example 
Below is the table P for the example set used above S = {3, 1, 1, 2, 2, 1}:

Analysis 

The algorithm can be extended to the -way multi-partitioning problem, but then takes  memory where  is the largest number in the input, making it impractical even for  unless the inputs are very small numbers.

This algorithm can be generalized to a solution for the subset sum problem.

References 

Number partitioning
Pseudo-polynomial time algorithms